Richard R. John, Jr. (born 1959) is an American historian who specializes in the history of business, technology, communications, and the state. He is a professor of history and communications at Columbia University.

Life and career
John was born in Lexington, Massachusetts in 1959. His father, Richard R. John, Sr., was the distinguished director of the U.S. Department of Transportation's Volpe Center from 1989 to 2004. He attended Lexington High School and went on to Harvard University where between 1981 and 1989, he earned a B.A. in social studies (magna cum laude), an M.A. in history, and a Ph.D. in the history of American civilization. He wrote his dissertation under the joint direction of Alfred D. Chandler Jr. and David Herbert Donald.

Academic posts
After serving as a teaching fellow in history, history and literature, and social studies at Harvard, John held a two-year postdoctoral fellowship at the College of William and Mary. He joined the history faculty at the University of Illinois at Chicago in 1991, where he taught until 2009. He is a professor of history and communications at Columbia University, where he advises graduate students in the Columbia Journalism's School's Ph. D. program in communications.  He regularly teaches a required course — History Essentials — in the journalism school's M.S. program.  He is a core member of Columbia's history faculty, where he advises Ph. D. students in history.  He also teaches undergraduate and graduate courses in the history of capitalism, the history of communications, social theory (including Contemporary Civilization), and American studies. Between 1983 and 1987, John served as managing and consulting editor of the Business History Review. He has been a fellow at the Newberry Library in Chicago and the Smithsonian Institution's Woodrow Wilson Center in Washington, D. C. He was the founder and coordinator of the Newberry Library Seminar on Technology, Politics, and Culture, which ran from 1998 to 2007. In 2001 and 2011, he served as a visiting professor at the École des Hautes Études en Sciences Sociales (EHESS) in Paris. In 2002, he was awarded the Harold F. Williamson Prize for a scholar at mid-career who has made "significant contributions to the field of business history," by the Business History Conference, an international professional society dedicated to the study of institutional history, which elected John its president for 2010-2011. Among the institutions that have sponsored his research are the College of William and Mary, the American Antiquarian Society, and the National Endowment for the Humanities, which awarded him a faculty fellowship in 2008. In 2019 he was awarded a Guggenheim Foundation fellowship for his research on the American antimonopoly tradition.

Publications
According to political scientist Christopher Parsons, in John's Network Nation (2010), the historian "has carefully poured through original source documents and so can offer insights into the actual machinations of politicians, investors, municipal aldermen, and communications companies’ CEOs and engineers to weave a comprehensive account of the telegraph and telephone industries." Network Nation won the Ralph Gomory Book Prize from the Business History Conference in 2011 and the 2011 Best Book Prize from the American Educators in Journalism and Mass Communications (AEJMC) History Division. See the Bibliography below.

Influence
Since assuming his post at Columbia University, John has been known for publicly challenging vogue political economic theses on the basis of the historical record, including Tim Wu's proclamations about media consolidation and disruption and mainstream media stirrings about Mitt Romney and the role of plutocrats in American politics. He is critical of proposals to privatize the post office, and supports postal banking.

Bibliography
John's publications include many essays, articles, and reviews, eight edited books, and two monographs, Spreading the News: The American Postal System from Franklin to Morse (Cambridge: Harvard University Press, 1995), and Network Nation: Inventing American Telecommunications (Cambridge: Belknap Press of Harvard University Press, 2010).

Authored Books
 2010 – Network Nation: Inventing American Telecommunications (Cambridge, Massachusetts: Belknap Press of Harvard University Press, 2017) .
 1995 – Spreading the News: The American Postal System from Franklin to Morse (Cambridge, Massachusetts: Harvard University Press, 1995; paperback, 1998; in print 2010) . Winner of the Allan Nevins Prize from the Society of American Historians, and the Herman E. Krooss Prize from the Business History Conference.

Edited Books
 2017 – Capital Gains: Business and Politics in Twentieth-Century America. (co-editor with Kim Phillips-Fein). Philadelphia: University of Pennsylvania Press, 2017  
 2015 – Making News: The Political Economy of Journalism in Britain and America from the Glorious Revolution to the Internet. (co-editor with Jonathan Silberstein-Loeb). Oxford: Oxford University Press. 
 2012 – The American Postal Network, 1792-1914, 4 vols. London:  Pickering & Chatto, 2012.
 2006 – Ruling Passions: Political Economy in Nineteenth Century America. University Park: Pennsylvania State University Press, 2006. Originally appeared as a special issue of the Journal of Policy History, 18:1 (2006); in print 2017. 
 1986 – Managing Big Business: Essays from the Business History Review. Co-editor, with Richard S. Tedlow. Boston: Harvard Business School Press, 1986.

Book Series Editorships
 “Business, Technology, and Politics.” Johns Hopkins University Press, since 2014.
 "American Business, Politics, and Society." University of Pennsylvania Press (with Pamela W. Laird, University of Colorado at Denver, and Mark Rose, Florida Atlantic University) from 2007-2012. 
 "How Things Worked: Institutional Dimensions of the American Past." Johns Hopkins University Press (with Robin Einhorn, University of California at Berkeley), since 2007.

Book Chapters
 “Publicity, Propaganda, and Public Opinion from the Titanic Disaster to the Hungarian Uprising” [with Heidi J. S. Tworek]. In Information: A Historical Companion, edited by Ann Blair, Paul Duguid, Anja Going, and Anthony Grafton. Princeton. Princeton University Press, 2021.
 “John Bull, Uncle Sam, Transatlantic Steamships, and the Mail.” In Postal History:  Multidisciplinary and Diachronic Perspectives, ed. Bruno Crevato-Selvaggi and Raffaella Gerola, pp.  193-207. Prato:  Istituto di Studi Storici Postali, 2020. 
 “When Techno-Diplomacy Failed: Walter S. Rogers, the Universal Electrical Communications Union, and the Limitations of the International Telegraph Union as a Global Actor in the 1920s.”  In History of the International Telecommunication Union (ITU): Transnational Techno-Diplomacy from the Telegraph to the Internet, edited by Gabriele Balbi and Andreas Fickers, pp. 51-68.  Berlin:  De Gruyter, 2020. 
 “Global Communications” [with Heidi J. S. Tworek]. In Routledge Handbook of the Makers of Global Business, edited by Teresa da Silva Lopes, Christina Lubinski, and Heidi J.S. Tworek, pp. 315-331. London: Routledge, 2020. 
 “The Public Image of the Universal Postal Union in the Anglophone World, 1874-1949.” In Exorbitant Expectations:  International Organizations and the Media in the Nineteenth and the Twentieth Centuries, edited by Jonas Brendebach, Martin Herzer, Heidi J.S. Tworek, pp. 38-69.  London: Routledge, 2018. 
 “Proprietary Interest: Merchants, Journalists, and Antimonopoly in the 1880s.” In Media Nation: The Political History of News in Modern America, edited by Bruce J. Schulman and Julian E. Zelizer, pp. 10–35. Philadelphia: University of Pennsylvania Press, 2017. 
 “From Political Economy to Civil Society: Arthur W. Page, Corporate Philanthropy, and the Reframing of the Past in Post-New Deal America.” In Boundaries of the State in U. S. History, edited by James T. Sparrow, William J. Novak, and Stephen W. Sawyer, pp. 295–324. Chicago: University of Chicago Press, 2015. 
 “Letters, Telegrams, News.” In The Edinburgh Companion to Nineteenth-Century American Letters and Letter-Writing, ed. Celeste-Marie Bernier, Judie Newman, and Matthew Pethers, pp. 119–35. Edinburgh: Edinburgh University Press, 2015. 
 “Point-to- Point: Telecommunications Networks from the Optical Telegraph to the Mobile Telephone" [with Gabriele Balbi]. In Handbook of Communications Science, vol. 5: Communication and Technology, edited by Lorenzo Cantoni and James A. Danowski, pp. 35-55.  Berlin: De Gruyter Mouton, 2015. 
 "American Political Development and Political History." In Oxford Handbook of American Political Development, ed. Richard Valelly, Suzanne Mettler, and Robert Lieberman, pp. 185-206. New York: Oxford University Press, 2016. 
 “Markets, Morality, and the Media: The Election of 1884 and the Iconography of Progressivism.” In America at the Ballot Box: Elections and Political History, edited by Gareth Davies and Julian E. Zelizer, pp. 75–97. Philadelphia: University of Pennsylvania Press, 2015. 
 “Communications Networks in the United States from Chappe to Marconi.” In International Encyclopedia of Media Studies, general editor Angharad N. Valdivia, vol. 1, pp. 310–332. London: Blackwell, 2013. 
 “From Franklin to Facebook: The Civic Mandate for American Communications.” In To Promote the General Welfare: The Case for Big Government, edited by Steven Conn, pp. 156–72. Oxford: Oxford University Press, 2012. 
 "Expanding the Realm of Communications." In An Extensive Republic: Print, Culture, and Society in the New Nation, edited by Robert A. Gross and Mary Kelley, pp. 211–220. Cambridge: Cambridge University Press, 2010. 
 "Private Enterprise, Public Good? Communications Deregulation as a National Political Issue, 1839-1851." In Beyond the Founders: New Approaches to the Political History of the Early American Republic, edited by Jeffrey L. Pasley, Andrew W. Robertson, and David Waldstreicher, pp. 328–354. Chapel Hill: University of North Carolina Press, 2004. 
 "Affairs of Office: The Executive Departments, the Election of 1828, and the Making of the Democratic Party." In The Democratic Experiment: New Directions in American Political History, edited by Meg Jacobs, William Novak, and Julian Zelizer, pp. 50–84. Princeton: Princeton University Press, 2003.

Articles and Essays
 “‘Circuits of Victory’: How the First World War Shaped the Political Economy of the Telephone in the United States and France” [with Léonard Laborie].  History and Technology, 35, no. 2 (2019): 115-37. 
 “Freedom of Expression in the Digital Age: A Historian’s Perspective.” Church, Communication, and Culture, 4, no. 1 (2019): 25-38. 
 “The State is Back In:  What Now?” Journal of the Early Republic, 38 (Spring 2018):  105-18. 
 "Projecting Power Overseas: U.S. Postal Policy and International Standard-Setting at the 1863 Paris Postal Conference," Journal of Policy History, 27, no. 3 (July 2015): 416-438. 
 "Robber Barons Redux: Antimonopoly Reconsidered.” Enterprise and Society, 13 (March 2012): 1-38.  
 "The Political Economy of Postal Reform in the Victorian Age." Smithsonian Contributions to History and Technology, 55: 3-12.  
 "The Postal Monopoly and Universal Service: A History." School of Public Policy, George Mason University, posted December 2008. Web:
 "Telecommunications." Enterprise and Society, 9:3 (September 2008): 507-520. Web: 
 "Turner, Beard, Chandler: Progressive Historians." Business History Review, 82 (Summer 2008): 227-240. Web: Social Science Research Network 
 "Governmental Institutions as Agents of Change: Rethinking American Political Development in the Early Republic, 1787-1835." Studies in American Political Development, 11 (Fall 1997): 347-380. Web: 
 "Elaborations, Revisions, Dissents: Alfred D. Chandler, Jr.'s., The Visible Hand after Twenty Years." Business History Review, 71:2 (Summer 1997): 151-200. Web:

See also
 Telegraph
 Telephone
 Postal System

References

External links
 Columbia University Graduate School of Journalism Faculty Profile
 Curriculum Vitae
 Business History Conference
 Academia.edu

21st-century American historians
21st-century American male writers
Columbia University Graduate School of Journalism faculty
Harvard University alumni
1959 births
Living people
Lexington High School alumni
American male non-fiction writers